was a Japanese author and philosopher. He was a graduate of Tōkyō Senmon Gakkō. He was originally a rationalist and then became a Christian. He is buried in Tokyo's Zōshigaya cemetery.

References

External links 
 

1873 births
1907 deaths
Japanese writers
Japanese philosophers
Japanese Christians